Caroline Bayantai Plumb OBE (born 23 November 1978) is a British internet entrepreneur and businesswoman. She is the current CEO and co-founder of Fluidly and previously served as a CEO of FreshMinds. She also currently serves as a non executive director of AIM-listed Mercia Technologies. In 2019, she was named as one of the most important women personalities in UK Tech 100 list.

Career 
Plumb was born in Manchester on 23 November 1978, the daughter of Stephen and Eleanor. She went to Bolton School Girls' Division. She then studied at St John's College, Oxford and gained a first class degree in Engineering, Economics and Management. After graduating she began her career as an entrepreneur and initiated FreshMinds as a research consultancy in 2000 with colleague Charlie Osmond. She left Freshminds and co-founded Fluidly, a cash flow management software business company and still serves as its Chief Executive Officer. In 2003, she was nominated in Management Today's 35 Women Under 35 list for her outstanding services in the business field. In 2010, she was appointed by the Prime Minister of the United Kingdom as a UK Business Ambassador in the "Professional and Business Services" sector, a position she held until the Business Ambassador Network was closed in 2019.

Plumb was appointed the OBE in the 2016 Birthday Honours "for services to business and charity". In February 2020, she co-founded the COVID-19 Volunteer Testing Network.

References 

Living people
British women academics
British businesspeople
Alumni of the University of Oxford
British women in business
Officers of the Order of the British Empire
1978 births